Charles Alfred Morton IV (born November 12, 1983) is an American professional baseball pitcher for the Atlanta Braves of Major League Baseball (MLB). The Braves selected Morton in the third round of the 2002 Major League Baseball draft. He has also previously played for the Pittsburgh Pirates, Philadelphia Phillies, Houston Astros, and Tampa Bay Rays. Morton was a World Series champion in 2017 and 2021 and an All-Star in 2018 and 2019.

Early life
Morton was born in Flemington, New Jersey, to Jeanne and Chip Morton, an accountant and former Penn State basketball player. His grandfather played in the Philadelphia Athletics farm system. He was raised in Trumbull, Connecticut, playing little league baseball with future major leaguers pitcher Craig Breslow and infielder Jamie D'Antona. Morton grew up attending ballgames at Yankee Stadium and idolizing Derek Jeter and Roger Clemens. He attended Joel Barlow High School in Redding, Connecticut, graduating in 2002.

Professional career

Draft and minor leagues (2002–2008) 
The Atlanta Braves selected Morton in the third round with the 95th overall selection of the 2002 Major League Baseball draft. He started his professional career in 2002 with the GCL Braves, and was 1–7. In 2003, he played for the Danville Braves, and was 2–5. He spent the 2004 and 2005 seasons with the Rome Braves. In 2006, he pitched for the Myrtle Beach Pelicans, and was 6–7. In 2007, he pitched for the Mississippi Braves, and was 4–6.

First stint with the Atlanta Braves (2008) 

The Braves added Morton to their 40-man roster on November 20, 2007. Morton made his major league debut on June 14, 2008, against the Los Angeles Angels of Anaheim, allowing three runs in six innings and earning his first major league win. In 2008 he was 4–8 with a 6.15 ERA.

Pittsburgh Pirates (2009–2015) 
On June 3, 2009, the Braves traded Morton with Gorkys Hernández and Jeff Locke to the Pittsburgh Pirates in exchange for Nate McLouth. He made his first start with the Pirates on June 10 pitching an inning against the Atlanta Braves, while Jeff Karstens got the win. On June 28, he received his first decision, a loss to the Kansas City Royals. On July 3, 2009, he won his first game pitching 6 innings of 1 hit baseball against the Florida Marlins. On September 30, 2009, he pitched a complete game 4 hitter with 8 strikeouts against the Chicago Cubs. His 2009 record in 18 starts was 5 wins and 9 losses, a 4.55 ERA, 97 innings pitched and 62 strikeouts, 40 walks, 7 home runs, 5 hit batsmen, .276 average against, and a 1.46 WHIP.

Morton began 2010 spring training as a member of the Pirates' starting rotation. He struggled losing all five starts in April and finishing the month with a 12.57 earned run average (ERA). However Morton delivered a promising performance on April 30, 2010, against the Los Angeles Dodgers, striking out 8 in six innings of work while allowing six runs (only three earned). That game he was dealt a loss as the Pirates only provided him with two runs of support. He earned his first win of the season on May 5 against the Chicago Cubs striking out three in a 4–2 decision. However he lost each of his next four starts, dropping his record on the season to 1–9 with a 9.35 ERA. A day after suffering his 9th loss against the Cincinnati Reds, the Pirates placed him on the 15-day disabled list with shoulder fatigue. After recovering, he was assigned to the Pirates Triple-A affiliate Indianapolis Indians.

Speaking before his first start with the Indians, Morton said "I was pressing. I wasn't being myself on the mound those last couple times I went out there in Pittsburgh. There was so much going on in my mind. At the end of last year, I finished strong, I got a glimpse of what I could do, truly, in the big leagues, going out there and going deep into games, being competitive, being someone who was pretty good. I wanted to be out there for myself and because I care about this team and organization. At the same time, though, after that last one, that last start, because I care about these guys is why, exactly, I knew I couldn't go back out there again."

Morton was recalled when starter Ross Ohlendorf was placed on the 15-day disabled list due to a shoulder injury. On his final start of the 2010 season, Morton compiled his finest pitching performance of the year striking out a career-high nine batters in a 2–0 loss to the Florida Marlins on October 2. He finished the season with a 2–12 record and a 7.57 ERA, but in his final six starts of the season after being recalled in late August he sported a 4.26 ERA.

2011 was Morton's best season yet, where he held a 10–10 record in 29 starts with a 3.83 ERA, earning the club's Breakout Player of the Year. On April 15, Morton threw a complete game against the Cincinnati Reds. On May 18, again at Great American Ball Park, Morton threw a complete game-shutout, striking out 5 and giving up 5 hits. Following the season, Morton underwent successful hip surgery to repair a torn labrum in October 2011 with a full recovery expected in 4–6 months. He was optimistic about returning before Opening Day. However, he began the 2012 season on the disabled list, making his season debut on April 14. His season ended when he underwent Tommy John surgery on June 14, 2012.

On June 13, 2013, Morton was activated off the DL. He picked up his first win of the season on June 18 in a shutout against the Cincinnati Reds. He pitched  innings giving up only 3 hits and no runs, while striking out 2. On July 22 and 27 he won back-to-back games for the first time since May 7 and 18, 2011. On December 11, 2013, Morton signed a three-year contract to remain with the Pirates, with a club option for the 2017 season. Morton was placed on the DL with right hip inflammation on August 17, 2014. At the time, he was 5–12 with a 3.84 ERA. During the month of September, Morton needed hip surgery, effectively ending his 2014 season. In 26 starts on 2014, Morton hit 19 batsmen with pitches, which led the Majors along with a 6–12 record and a 3.72 ERA.

During 2015 spring training, Morton struggled thoroughly and began to experience inflammation in his recently surgically repaired hip. On April 5, 2015, the Pirates placed Morton on the 15-day disabled list.

Philadelphia Phillies (2016) 
On December 12, 2015, the Pirates traded Morton to the Philadelphia Phillies in exchange for David Whitehead. His season came to an abrupt end on April 23, 2016, when Morton suffered a hamstring injury running to first base in a game against the Milwaukee Brewers and was placed on the disabled list the next day. On April 27, the Phillies announced Morton would miss the rest of the 2016 season with a torn hamstring.

Houston Astros (2017–2018) 
On November 16, 2016, Morton signed a two-year, $14 million contract with the Houston Astros. During the 2017 regular season, Morton made 25 starts, compiling a 14–7 record with a 3.62 ERA. He pitched  innings and recorded 163 strikeouts. Morton started Game 3 of the American League Championship Series (ALCS) at Yankee Stadium.  He lost the game, giving up 7 runs in  innings.  On October 21, he won Game 7 of the ALCS at Minute Maid Park, pitching five shutout innings with five strikeouts, sending the Astros to the World Series. Morton started Game 4 of the World Series and pitched well over 6.1 innings giving up one earned run on 3 hits and 7 strikeouts in an eventual Astros loss. Morton pitched the final four innings in Game 7 of the World Series. He was credited as the winning pitcher helping the Astros win their first World Series title. Three years later, it was revealed in the Houston Astros sign stealing scandal that the team had broken MLB rules during the 2017 season. Morton admitted he knew about the team's cheating and expressed regret that he did not do anything to stop it.

In 2018, Morton continued his successful stint with the Astros.  On May 12, he set a personal record of 14 strikeouts over seven innings in a 6–1 victory against the Texas Rangers. Entering the All-Star break third in the American League with 11 wins, 11.7 strikeouts per nine innings, and ninth in ERA (2.96), Morton was added to the AL roster for the 2018 MLB All-Star Game. Morton avoided serious injury in 2018, with only a short trip to the 10-day DL for shoulder discomfort. He pitched 167 innings, second only to his 2011 high of 171.2. Morton finished the regular season with a 3.13 ERA, a 15–3 win–loss record, and 201 strikeouts, all constituting career highs.

Tampa Bay Rays (2019–2020) 
On December 21, 2018, the Tampa Bay Rays signed Morton to a two-year, $30 million contract. He made his debut as a Ray against the Astros on March 29, 2019, pitching five innings and earning the win. On June 30, he was awarded his second consecutive All-Star appearance. In 2019, he led all major league pitchers in home runs/9 innings pitched, at 0.694. He set career highs in wins (16), ERA (3.05), innings and strikeouts (240). He finished in third place for the Cy Young Award. Morton started the American League Wild Card Game against the Oakland Athletics, receiving a win in five innings of work. This was Morton's third career win in winner-take-all playoff games, the most in MLB playoff history.

On August 10, 2020, Morton was placed on the injured list with inflammation in his right shoulder. Morton finished the 2020 year with an ERA of 4.74 over 38 innings. Morton pitched in game 7 of the American League Championship Series against his former team the Houston Astros. He recorded his fourth win in a winner-take-all playoff game, extending his record.

On October 30, 2020, the Rays declined their $15 million team option on his contract for the  season, and he was declared a free agent. At the time the Rays made their decision, it was reported that they were looking for a "creative" way to re-sign Morton as a free agent for the following year.

Second stint with the Atlanta Braves (2021–present) 
On November 24, 2020, the Atlanta Braves signed Morton to a one-year, $15 million contract. On September 6, 2021, Morton and the Braves agreed to a one-year extension worth $20 million.

In the 2021 regular season, he was 14–6 with a 3.34 ERA in 33 starts.

On October 26, 2021, during Game 1 of the World Series versus the Houston Astros, Morton left the game after pitching only  innings with what was revealed to be a right fibula fracture.  The injury occurred in the previous inning when Astros batter Yuli Gurriel hit a ball directly into Morton's leg.  Initially believing he was unharmed, Morton continued to pitch, completing 16 more pitches—including a strikeout of former MVP José Altuve—before removing himself from the game. Morton did not play for the remainder of the series.  The Braves later won the World Series, giving the Braves their first title since 1995 and Morton his second World Series ring. On September 30, 2022, Morton and the Braves agreed to a one-year contract extension for the 2023 season worth $20 million. Morton recorded at least 200 strikeouts in consecutive seasons with the team, and became the third Atlanta Braves pitcher to have struck out 200 or more batters in multiple seasons.

In 2022, he was 9-6 with a 4.34 ERA, as in 31 starts he pitched 172 innings, and threw curveballs 38% of the time, more than any other pitcher in major league baseball. The active career leader in hit batsmen with 156, he hit 18 batters, second in the NL.

Pitching style
Morton's repertoire consisted in 2013 of a four-seam fastball, a sinker, a curveball, and a split-finger fastball with his speed maxing out in the low 90s. Morton picked up the splitter in 2011 having previously thrown a changeup. He also has previously thrown a slider and a cutter. Morton's sinker was his most common pitch, especially against right-handed hitters. His curveball was his most common pitch in a two strike count.

Due to changes in his delivery and the emphasis he has placed on the sinker, Morton drew comparisons to Roy Halladay. Pirates special assistant Jim Benedict had previously encouraged Morton to emulate Halladay's delivery during spring training. Morton featured his new sinker almost exclusively in his first starts of the 2011 season and it resulted in an increased groundball rate but also more bases on balls. Pirates' fans christened him with the nickname "Ground Chuck."

In the 2015 offseason, a frustrated Morton began experimenting with throwing harder, alongside adjustments to his technique and workouts. In his injury-abbreviated starts with the Phillies, he showcased his newfound velocity. Along with high spin rates, this attracted the attention of Houston's front office which signed him and encouraged Morton to continue throwing hard four-seam fastballs, as Morton felt his sinker was becoming ineffective.  While playing for the Astros, Morton transformed into a strikeout pitcher finding new effectiveness against left-handed hitters. With Houston his primary pitches were a four-seam fastball reaching 98-99 MPH and a curveball with considerable vertical and horizontal movement, which Morton considers his best pitch. In 2018, his improvements on his curveball was attributed to his low three-quarters position, but slightly above sidearm at release.

Personal life
Morton and his wife, Cindy, have four children. They reside in Bradenton, Florida.

See also
 List of people from Redding, Connecticut
 List of World Series starting pitchers

References

External links

1983 births
Living people
American League All-Stars
People from Flemington, New Jersey
Baseball players from New Jersey
Sportspeople from Hunterdon County, New Jersey
Major League Baseball pitchers
Atlanta Braves players
Pittsburgh Pirates players
Philadelphia Phillies players
Houston Astros players
Tampa Bay Rays players
Gulf Coast Braves players
Danville Braves players
Rome Braves players
Myrtle Beach Pelicans players
Mississippi Braves players
Richmond Braves players
Gwinnett Braves players
Indianapolis Indians players
Bradenton Marauders players
Altoona Curve players
Peoria Javelinas players
Toros del Este players
American expatriate baseball players in the Dominican Republic